Eugenia Żmijewska (born in 1865 in Uman, died in 1923 in Warsaw) was a Polish novelist, current affairs writer and literary translator.

Biography 

Her literary work revolved mainly around women's sexual identity and its development in more mature years. This is exemplified in her main body of work, a trilogy, which focuses on a woman who is in an unsuccessful romantic relationship, tries to focus on a professional career as an editor but eventually marries and compromises her ambitions.

She worked at Słowa, as an editor and writer. From the year 1899 she was the editor of the monthly supplement Ognisko for the magazine Kurier Polski which was active from 1829 to 1831 in Warsaw. 1914 onwards she was an editor for Świat Kobiety

She was one of the founders of the Polish Writers and Journalists Association.

Novels 

 1907 – Little Flame: From the Diary of an Institute Girl 
 1909 – Fate
 1911 – Sweetheart
 1912 – Młodzi
 1921 – Car i unitka
 1910 – From the diary of a failed
 1912 – Z daleka i z bliska
 1913 – Scouts: Stories for the Polish Youth (Skauci: Powieść dla młodzieży) 
 1917 – Pole, a citizen

Translations 

She was the first ever translator of two of Arthur Conan Doyle's Sherlock Holmes novels The Sign of Four published in 1890 and The Hound of the Baskervilles published in 1902 to the Polish language.

References 

1865 births
1923 deaths